The Cloud Dodger is a 1928 silent drama film directed by Bruce M. Mitchell and starring real life aviator Al Wilson. The action film was produced and distributed by Universal Pictures.

Like many actors in the silent film era, Wilson did not survive the transition to "talkies", with The Cloud Dodger, one of his last films.

Plot
Al Williams (Al Wilson), an aviator whose sweetheart Sylvia Lemoyne (Gloria Grey) has left him for Stanton Stevens, a wealthy suitor, who flies off.

Al interrupts their wedding and enlisting a friend to fly his aircraft, chases them. Seeing Al, Sylvia regrets her choice and pines for him. Seeing his sweetheart about to get away, using a rope ladder, Al climbs down into Stanton's aircraft.

Al snatches Sylvia from her seat and transfers her to his aircraft, fully equipped with a minister and witnesses.

Cast

 Al Wilson as Al Williams
 Gloria Grey as Sylvia Lemoyne
 Joe O'Brien as Stanton Stevens
 Julia Griffith as Mrs. Lemoyne/Aunt Myrtle
 Gilbert Holmes as Joe Merriman

Production
Al Wilson was not only the star of The Cloud Dodger but also flew as a "stunt pilot" in the film. After becoming a flying instructor and a short period as manager of the Mercury Aviation Company, founded by one of his students, Cecil B. DeMille, Wilson became more and more skilled in performing stunts, including wing-walking, and left the company to become a professional stunt pilot, specializing in Hollywood aviation films.

Wilson worked together with stuntmen like Frank Clarke and Wally Timm and also for film companies, including Universal Pictures. After numerous appearances in stunt roles, he started his career as an actor in 1923 with the serial The Eagle's Talons. Wilson produced his own movies until 1927, when he went back to work with Universal.

Reception
Aviation film historian Stephen Pendo, in Aviation in the Cinema (1985) said The Cloud Dodger was only one of a long list of aviation films that showcased Wilson's talents. He alternately wrote, acted and flew in a career that "spanned more than 10 years, and he acted in more films than any other professional pilot." In The Cloud Dodger, Pendo noted the aerial stunts featured an "elopement and fight in the air" with a  pick-up of the heroine from another aircraft by the hero on a ladder hanging from his own aircraft.

Preservation status
Copies of The Cloud Dodger are held by George Eastman Museum and the Library of Congress.

References

Notes

Citations

Bibliography

 Catalog of Holdings, The American Film Institute Collection and The United Artists Collection at The Library of Congress. Los Angeles, California: American Film Institute, 1978.  .
 Pendo, Stephen. Aviation in the Cinema. Lanham, Maryland: Scarecrow Press, 1985. .
 Wynne, H. Hugh. The Motion Picture Stunt Pilots and Hollywood's Classic Aviation Movies. Missoula, Montana: Pictorial Histories Publishing Co., 1987. .

External links
 The Cloud Dodger at IMDb.com
 
 lobby card(archived worthpoint)

1928 films
1920s action drama films
American silent feature films
Universal Pictures films
American aviation films
American black-and-white films
American action drama films
Films directed by Bruce M. Mitchell
1920s American films
Silent American drama films